Harpers West One was an ATV television drama series about a fictional department store, Harpers, in the West 1 district of London.

The show was created by John Whitney and Geoffrey Bellman and ran in one-hour episodes from 1961 to 1963. It was introduced by ATV while The Probation Officer, was being rested but became an immediate success. Press releases described it as "shopping with the lid off". A combination of drama and soap opera, it has also been described as presaging corporate dramas such as The Brothers for its depiction of power struggles at board level.

The principal writers were Geoffrey Bellman, Derrick De Marney, Diana Noel, and John Whitney. Wendy Richard, who later appeared in the comedy Are You Being Served?, also set in a department store, appeared in four episodes in 1962. The show sometimes featured popular singers in the "music department" such as John Leyton who played the role of Johnny St Cyr and sang the song "Johnny Remember Me". The publicity helped him to establish his career.

Selected cast
 Norman Bowler – Roger Pike
 Graham Crowden – Edward Cruickshank
 Arthur Hewlett – Aubrey Harper
 Jan Holden – Harriet Carr
 Tristram Jellinek – Mike Gilmore
 Philip Latham – Oliver Backhouse
 Jane Muir – Frances Peters
 Vivian Pickles – Julie Wheeler
 Wendy Richard - Susan Sullivan

References

External links
Harpers West One episode featuring John Leyton.

1961 British television series debuts
1963 British television series endings
1960s British drama television series
1961 in London